The 2017 BYU Cougars men's volleyball team will represent Brigham Young University in the 2017 NCAA Division I & II men's volleyball season. The Cougars, led by second year head coach Shawn Olmstead, play their home games at Smith Fieldhouse. The Cougars are members of the MPSF and were picked to win the MPSF in the preseason poll. They reached the NCAA National Championship for the second year in a row before being swept by Ohio State. The Cougars finished the year ranked #2 in the nation.

Season highlights
Will be filled in as the season progresses.

Roster

Schedule
TV/Internet Streaming/Radio information:
BYU Radio will simulcast most BYUtv games with the BYUtv feed. 
Campus Insiders TheW.tv will air select games when BYUtv has basketball commitments. These games will not be aired on BYU Radio. 

 *-Indicates conference match.
 Times listed are Mountain Time Zone.

Announcers for televised games
Lewis: No commentary
Loyola-Chicago: Jason Goch & Ray Gooden
McKendree: Dave Neely
Concordia-Irvine: Dave Neely
McKendree: Jarom Jordan, Steve Vail, & Lauren Francom
CSUN: No commentary
CSUN: No commentary
UC Irvine: Jarom Jordan, Steve Vail, & Lauren Francom
UC Irvine: Dave Neely
UCLA: Jarom Jordan, Steve Vail, & Lauren Francom
UCLA: Robbie Bullough & Dave Neely
USC: Paul Duchesne & Paul Yoder 
UC San Diego: Jarom Jordan, Steve Vail, & Lauren Francom
UC San Diego: Jarom Jordan, Steve Vail, & Lauren Francom
Stanford: Kevin Barnett & Don Shaw
Stanford: No commentary
Cal Baptist: Robbie Bullough & Dave Neely
Pepperdine: Al Epstein
Pepperdine: Al Epstein
Hawai'i: Jarom Jordan, Steve Vail, & Lauren Francom
Hawai'i: Jarom Jordan, Steve Vail, & Lauren Francom
Princeton: Jarom Jordan, Steve Vail, & Lauren Francom
Long Beach State: Jarom Jordan, Steve Vail, & Lauren Francom
Long Beach State: Jarom Jordan, Steve Vail, & Lauren Francom
UC Santa Barbara: No commentary
UC Santa Barbara: No commentary
Stanford: Jarom Jordan, Steve Vail, & Lauren Francom
Hawai'i: Rob Espero & Nate Ngo
Barton: No commentary
Long Beach State: Ralph Bednarczyk
Ohio State: Paul Sunderland & Kevin Barnett

References

2017 in sports in Utah
2017 NCAA Division I & II men's volleyball season
2017 team